James Baar (February 9, 1929 – October 3, 2021) was an author, international corporate communications consultant, corporate communications software developer, blogger, former business executive, journalist and sometime college lecturer.

His latest  books include "Conversations at the Redwood: The Portraits Speak" (historical fiction),  "A King for America" (political satire) and "But Wait! There’s More! [maybe]," a book on the advertising agency business’ Golden Age and current chaos.

Early life and career

Born in New York City, Baar graduated from Union College (New York) in 1949 where he majored in philosophy. Baar began his newspaper career on The Record in Troy, New York where he "specialized in reporting obits, church notices and the occasional arson." He graduated to the United Press and subsequently was a reporter and editor in the UPI Washington Bureau and Senior Editor of Missiles & Rockets Magazine.

In his later business career, Baar has been Chief Operating Officer in four major public relations agencies: Hill & Knowlton Advanced Technology, Gray-Strayton, Creamer Dickson Basford and Lewis & Gilman. He also was Corporate Communications Officer of Computervision, Managing Director of General Electric’s European Communications Operation and manager of various GE PR operations in the United States.

Personal life
He and his wife, Beverly, live in Providence, Rhode Island. Baar died on October 3, 2021 in Providence, Rhode Island.

Published works

Polaris! (with William E Howard), 1960, 
Combat Missileman (with William E Howard), 1961,  ASIN #B0007DWQD4
Spacecraft & Missiles of the World 1962 (with William E. Howard), ASN #B0000EGOMB
The Great Free Enterprise Gambit, 1980,  
The Careful Voters Dictionary of Language Pollution (Understanding Willietalk and Other Spinspeak), 1999,  
Spinspeak II: The Dictionary of Language Pollution, 2004, 
Ultimate Severance, 2005, 
But Wait! There's More (maybe) (with Donald E. Creamer), 2008, 
The Real Thing and Other Tales, 2011, 
A King for America (novella), 2013 ASIN-B00C7875C6
Trump Card: Holding America's Enemies at Bay (with William E. Howard), 
Conversations at the Redwood: The Portraits Speak, 2018,

References

1929 births
2021 deaths
American bloggers
20th-century American novelists
20th-century American male writers
Union College (New York) alumni
Businesspeople from New York City
Businesspeople from Providence, Rhode Island
American male novelists
21st-century American novelists
Writers from Providence, Rhode Island
21st-century American male writers
Novelists from New York (state)
American male bloggers